Gábor Szegvári is a former Hungarian motorcycle speedway rider who was a member of Hungary team at 2001 Speedway World Cup.

Career details 
 Team World Championship (Speedway World Team Cup and Speedway World Cup)
 2001 - 10th place
 Individual European Championship
 2001 -  Heusden Zolder - 15th place (1 pt)
 European Club Champions' Cup
 2001 - 2nd place in Group A
 Individual Hungarian Championship
 1993 - 18th place (1 pt)
 1994 - 12th place (11 pts)
 1995 - 14th place (17 pts)
 1997 - 14th place (17 pts)
 1999 - 10th place (21 pts)
 2000 - 9th place (28 pts)
 2001 - 8th place (35 pts)
 2002 - 7th place (33 pts)
 2003 - 19th place (5 pts)
 Individual Junior Hungarian Championship
 1996 - Hungarian Champion

See also 
 Hungary national speedway team

References 

Living people
Hungarian speedway riders
Year of birth missing (living people)